There are fourteen Grade I listed buildings in Leicester. In the United Kingdom, the term listed building refers to a building or other structure officially designated as being of special architectural, historical or cultural significance. Grade I structures are those considered to be "buildings of exceptional interest". Listing was begun by a provision in the Town and Country Planning Act 1947. Once listed, severe restrictions are imposed on the modifications allowed to a building's structure or its fittings. In England, the authority for listing under the Planning (Listed Buildings and Conservation Areas) Act 1990 rests with Historic England, a non-departmental public body sponsored by the Department for Culture, Media and Sport. Local authorities have a responsibility to regulate and enforce the planning regulations.

There are also ten Scheduled Monuments in Leicester, some of which are also listed buildings.

List of Grade I buildings 

|}

Notes

References

See also 
 Scheduled Monuments in Leicester

External links 

 Full list of listed buildings in Leicester

Buildings and structures in Leicester
Lists of Grade I listed buildings in Leicestershire